Sowmeeh-ye Sang (also Romanized as Şowme‘eh-ye Sang; also known as Şowma‘eh) is a village in Kuhsar Rural District, in the Central District of Hashtrud County, East Azerbaijan Province, Iran. At the 2006 census, its population was 55, in 8 families.

References 

Towns and villages in Hashtrud County